The Anglican Diocese of Sapele lies within the Anglican Province of Bendel,  one of 14 provinces within the Church of Nigeria. The  current bishop is Blessing Erifeta.

Notes

Church of Nigeria dioceses
Dioceses of the Province of Bendel